The Minister of Foreign Affairs of Hungary is a member of the Hungarian cabinet and the head of the Ministry of Foreign Affairs. The current foreign minister is Péter Szijjártó.

The position was called People's Commissar of Foreign Affairs during the Hungarian Soviet Republic in 1919 and Minister besides the King between 1848 and 1918, except in 1849 when Hungary declared its independence from the Austrian Empire. During the Austro-Hungarian Monarchy (1867–1918) the two countries also had a joint Minister of Foreign Affairs.

This page is a list of Ministers of Foreign Affairs of Hungary.

Ministers besides the King (1848)

Hungarian Kingdom (1848)
Parties

Ministers of Foreign Affairs (1849)

Hungarian State (1849)
Parties

After the collapse of the Hungarian Revolution of 1848, the Hungarian Kingdom became an integral part of the Austrian Empire until 1867, when dual Austro-Hungarian Monarchy was created.

Ministers besides the King (1867–1918)

Hungarian Kingdom (1867–1918)
Parties

Ministers of Foreign Affairs (1918–1919)

Hungarian People's Republic (1918–1919)
Parties

People's Commissars of Foreign Affairs (1919)

Hungarian Soviet Republic (1919)
Parties

Counter-revolutionary governments (1919)
Parties

Ministers of Foreign Affairs (1919–present)

Hungarian People's Republic (1919)
Parties

Hungarian Republic (1919–1920)
Parties

Hungarian Kingdom (1920–1946)
Parties

Government of National Unity (1944–1945)
Parties

Soviet-backed provisional governments (1944–1946)
Parties

Hungarian Republic (1946–1949)
Parties

Hungarian People's Republic (1949–1989)
Parties

Hungarian Republic / Hungary (1989–present)
Parties

See also
List of heads of state of Hungary
List of prime ministers of Hungary
List of Ministers of Agriculture of Hungary
List of Ministers of Civilian Intelligence Services of Hungary
List of Ministers of Croatian Affairs of Hungary
List of Ministers of Defence of Hungary
List of Ministers of Education of Hungary
List of Ministers of Finance of Hungary
List of Ministers of Interior of Hungary
List of Ministers of Justice of Hungary
List of Ministers of Public Works and Transport of Hungary
Politics of Hungary

Foreign Ministers
 
 

hu:A király személye körüli miniszterek listája